The Rocky Road is the fifth studio album by Damien Dempsey. In The Rocky Road, Dempsey endeavours to pull together a fine collection of ballads, some well-known ('The Rocky Road to Dublin', 'The Foggy Dew') and others less-so ('Schooldays Over', 'Hot Asphalt'), while enrolling Dubliners John Sheahan and Barney McKenna to ensure the musicianship demonstrates familiarity and love for the songs selected. The album was released June 6, 2008, in Ireland on SonyBMG and on August 26 in the U.S. via United For Opportunity. The album has 11 tracks.

Track listing
 The Rocky Road To Dublin
 Schooldays Over
 A Rainy Night In Soho
 The Twang Man
 Sullivan John
 Kelly From Killan/The Teetotaler
 The Foggy Dew
 Hot Asphalt
 Night Visiting Song
 The Hackler From Grouse Hall/The Monaghan Jig
 Madam I'm A Darlin'

References

External links
Damien Dempsey's Discography 
Eamon Sweeney (17 December 2010), Reviews: Damien Dempsey, Independent.ie
Damien Dempsey - The Rocky Road, RTE (18 June 2008)

Damien Dempsey albums
2008 albums